Rae Lin D'Alie (born 31 October 1987) is an Italian basketball player. She competed in the 2020 Summer Olympics.

References

1987 births
Living people
Sportspeople from Bologna
People from Waterford, Wisconsin
Italian women's basketball players
Basketball players from Wisconsin
3x3 basketball players at the 2020 Summer Olympics
Olympic 3x3 basketball players of Italy
Italian women's 3x3 basketball players